Ayopaya or Independencia is a town in the Cochabamba Department, Bolivia. It is the capital of the Ayopaya Province and Ayopaya Municipality. At the time of census 2001 it had a population of 2,014.

References

External links 
 Map of Ayopaya Province

Populated places in Cochabamba Department